ChemElectroChem is a biweekly peer-reviewed scientific journal covering pure and applied electrochemistry. It is published by Wiley-VCH on behalf of Chemistry Europe. The journal publishes original research covering topics such as energy applications, electrochemistry at interfaces/surfaces, photoelectrochemistry, and bioelectrochemistry.

According to the Journal Citation Reports, the journal has a 2021 impact factor of 4.782.

References

External links

Chemistry Europe academic journals
Wiley-VCH academic journals
English-language journals
Chemistry journals
Electrochemistry journals
Biweekly journals